The following is a list of flags used in Kosovo.

Republic of Kosovo

State flag

Government flags

Municipal flags

The "Law on use of State Symbols of Kosovo" grants the municipalities of Kosovo the right to adopt and use their own distinctive flags.

Political Parties Flags

Historical Flags

Flags of Kosovo under UN administration

Ethnic Albanian flags in Kosovo during Yugoslav rule

Flag proposals

See also
 Flag of Kosovo
 Emblem of Kosovo
 List of Albanian flags
 Albanian heraldry

Notes

References

External links

Flag
Lists and galleries of flags
Flags